Ada Colangeli (5 March 1913 – 29 February 1992) was an Italian character actress.

Life and career 
Born in Rome, Colangeli began acting in the early 1940s, and she was mainly cast in roles of women from a low social class. Active for about twenty years, she often collaborated with the director Alessandro Blasetti, of whom she was a real life friend. Her credits also include works by Federico Fellini, Luigi Zampa, Luigi Comencini, Carlo Lizzani and Mario Camerini.

Selected filmography

 An Adventure of Salvator Rosa (1939) - Una popolana
 One Hundred Thousand Dollars (1940) - Francesca, la moglie di Paul
 The Iron Crown (1941) - (uncredited)
 Four Steps in the Clouds (1942) - Anna - La serva (uncredited)
 Dagli Appennini alle Ande (1943)
 Apparizione (1943) - Geltrude
 Nessuno torna indietro (1945) - Una sorvegliante
 Un giorno nella vita (1946) - Suor Gaetana
 Alarm Bells (1949) - Francesca
 The Bride Can't Wait (1949) - Sister Celeste
 Maracatumba... ma non è una rumba! (1949) - Domestica del conte
 Welcome, Reverend! (1950)
 His Last Twelve Hours (1950) - La direttrice del collegio (uncredited)
 È arrivato il cavaliere! (1950) - (uncredited)
 Strano appuntamento (1950)
 Rome-Paris-Rome (1951) - Assunta
 Una bruna indiavolata! (1951) - Caterina
 The City Stands Trial (1952) - The Maid at Tortorella's (uncredited)
 The Shameless Sex (1952) - Portinaia
 Lieutenant Giorgio (1952) - Evelina (uncredited)
 Il romanzo della mia vita (1952) - (uncredited)
 Una croce senza nome (1952)
 Er fattaccio (1952)
 Carne inquieta (1952)
 Prisoner in the Tower of Fire (1952) - L'ancella
 La voce del silenzio (1953) - (uncredited)
 One of Those (1953) - (uncredited)
 Anni facili (1953)
 Via Padova 46 (1953) - The Woman Who Gets Out of the Lift (uncredited)
 Pane, amore e fantasia (1953) - Una comare intrigante (uncredited)
 Chronicle of Poor Lovers (1954) - Fidalma
 A Slice of Life (1954) - (segment "Casa d'altri")
 Papà Pacifico (1954)
 Disonorata - Senza colpa (1954) - Madre di Amedeo
 Woman of Rome (1954) - Padrona della pensione
 La Luciana (1954)
 Too Bad She's Bad (1954) - Una signora al commissariato (uncredited)
 The Art of Getting Along (1954) - Cameriera dei gesuiti (uncredited)
 Le signorine dello 04 (1955) - The Caretaker (uncredited)
 Il bidone (1955) - Minor Role (uncredited)
 The Belle of Rome (1955) - Vicina di casa di Gracco (uncredited)
 Bravissimo (1955) - Woman with a tall Candle (uncredited)
 Girls of Today (1955) - Filomena
 Revelation (1955) - Rosa (uncredited)
 Lucky to Be a Woman (1956) - Minor Role (uncredited)
 The Bigamist (1956) - Minor Role (uncredited)
 The Intruder (1956) - Caterina (uncredited)
 Difendo il mio amore (1956) - Minor Role (uncredited)
 I calunniatori (1956)
 Marisa (1957) - (uncredited)
 Ladro lui, ladra lei (1958) - Poplana alla finestra (uncredited)
 Nel blu dipinto di blu (1959) - Sor Napoleone's Wife (uncredited) (final film role)

References

External links 

Actresses from Rome
Italian film actresses
1913 births
1992 deaths
20th-century Italian actresses
People of Lazian descent